Tag Image File Format/Electronic Photography (TIFF/EP) is a digital image file format  standard – ISO 12234-2, titled "Electronic still-picture imaging – Removable memory – Part 2: TIFF/EP image data format". This is different from the Tagged Image File Format, which is a standard administered by Adobe currently called "TIFF, Revision 6.0 Final – June 3, 1992".

The TIFF/EP standard is based on a subset of the  Adobe TIFF standard, and a subset of the  JEITA Exif standard, with some differences and extensions.

One of the uses of TIFF/EP is as a raw image format.  A characteristic of most digital cameras (but excluding those using the Foveon X3 sensor or similar, hence especially Sigma cameras) is that they use a color filter array (CFA). Software processing a raw image format for such a camera needs information about the configuration of the color filter array, so that the raw image can identify separate data from the individual sites of the sensor. Ideally this information is held within the raw image file itself, and TIFF/EP uses the tags that begin "CFA", CFARepeatPatternDim and CFAPattern, which are only relevant for raw images.

This standard has not been adopted by most camera manufacturers – Exif/DCF is the current industry standard file organisation system which uses the Exchangeable image file format. However, TIFF/EP provided a basis for the raw image formats of a number of cameras. One example is Nikon's NEF raw file format, which uses the tag TIFF/EPStandardID (with value 1.0.0.0). Adobe's DNG (Digital Negative) raw file format was based on TIFF/EP, and the DNG specification states "DNG... is compatible with the TIFF-EP standard". Several cameras use DNG as their raw file format, so in that limited sense they use TIFF/EP too.

New Tags 
The following new tags are defined in the TIFF/EP standard, all to be placed in the first TIFF Image File Directory (IFD)

Differences from TIFF and Exif 

There are no major departures by the TIFF/EP standard from the TIFF standard, except that many of the TIFF tags are ignored.

The TIFF/EP standard does however have a few notable differences from the Exif standards:

 All tags used by TIFF/EP which are defined by the Exif standard to reside within the Exif Sub-IFD now reside directly under the first (main) TIFF IFD.
 The Exif IFD Sub-IFD, Interoperability Sub-IFD and the MakerNote Tag have all been omitted.
 Unlike the TIFF 6.0 standard, the TIFF/EP standard defines a method of dealing with thumbnail images. This however is different from the method that is used in the Exif standard.
 Several tags defined by the Exif standard have been re-defined in the TIFF/EP standard – see table below.

Compression 
Images in TIFF/EP files may be stored in uncompressed form, or using JPEG baseline DCT-based lossy compression. TIFF/EP also allows usage of other compression methods, but TIFF/EP readers are not required to decompress these images. All TIFF/EP readers shall support the DCT (lossy) baseline version of the TIFF/JPEG compression method described in TIFF 6.0 Technical note #2. The JPEG compression is indicated using a value of 000716 in the Compression tag-field as a binary value.

There may be more than one image (subfile) in a TIFF 6.0 file. Each subfile is defined by Image File Directory (IFD). If an image compression method is used in TIFF/EP, an uncompressed Baseline TIFF-readable "thumbnail" image (with a reduced-resolution) should also be stored in the 0th IFD of TIFF/EP, to allow the images to be viewed and identified using a Baseline TIFF 6.0 reader. (Note: JPEG compression is not required for Baseline TIFF 6.0 readers.)

TIFF/EP files may optionally use lossless JPEG compression and other JPEG compressions, but TIFF/EP readers are not required to decompress these images. If the lossless JPEG compression is used, the recommended form is lossless sequential DPCM using Huffman coding. TIFF/EP files may also optionally support vendor unique compression, but TIFF/EP readers are only required to open the uncompressed "thumbnail" image that may be present in IFD0. Proprietary compression methods can be used by obtaining a private compression tag value from the TIFF administrator (Adobe).

TIFF/EP complies with the TIFF 6.0 specification. The reason is to maintain compatibility with existing TIFF readers, and to make the adoption of TIFF/EP as easy as possible.

The TIFF Tag 259 (010316) stores the information about the Compression method. Its use is mandatory in TIFF/EP. There is no default value in TIFF/EP, but the tag value shall equal "000116" for the thumbnail IFD. The following is a list of defined TIFF/EP compression schemes:

Timeline for development and revision 
Dates limited to publicly available sources:

See also 
Tagged Image File Format (TIFF)
Exchangeable image file format (Exif)
Design rule for Camera File system
International Organization for Standardization
List of ISO standards

References

External links 
ISO 12234-2:2001 Electronic still-picture imaging – Removable memory – Part 2: TIFF/EP image data format
Link to a copy of the 1998 draft standard

ISO standards
Graphics file formats